The London Musicians Collective (LMC) is a cultural charity based in London, England devoted to the support and promotion of contemporary, experimental and improvised music.

From its foundation in 1975 until its reorganization in 2009, the LMC organized concerts, festivals, tours, workshops and publications in support of experimental music.

The LMC grew from Musics and had overlapping membership. It had some of the same approach to division of labour as the magazine. While the latter chose financial independence, the LMC at its first meeting rejected this policy by 37 votes to 1. The LMC then applied to the Arts Council of Great Britain for funding.

Two LPs were produced, numbered LMC1 and LMC2, but they were independent productions not directly initiated by the main collective.

In 2002, the LMC was awarded a community radio licence to broadcast a new radio station, Resonance FM, in central London. It also produced a magazine, Resonance, and a range of CDs.

The LMC is funded by donations, membership fees and grants. It was supported by Arts Council England until its funding was cut in 2008.

References

External links
 A history of the LMC
 Get A Haircut And Disappear: The History and Legacy of the London's Musician's Collective
 Charity commission register. Entries for LMC charity number 290236

Trevor Barre (2021) "The London Musicians Collective: An Obstinate Clot of Invention" Limbic Books ISBN 9781527268579

Music in London
Charities based in London